Indie Sex is a 2007 
American television documentary film directed by Lesli Klainberg.

Synopsis 
The four-part documentary series that explores sexuality as it is presented and received in films and throughout film history. The movie looks at how film and policy makers have attempted to censor and free sexual images, whether it be through regulations or exploring topics such as teen sex, sexual taboos, or pushing material to sexual extremes.  Discussions range from the Pre-Code film era as early as the 1910s to modern cinema.

Featured in Indie Sex
 Dita Von Teese
 Heather Matarazzo
 Peter Sarsgaard
 Guinevere Turner
 Alonso Duralde
 Colette Burson
 Dana Stevens
 Jami Bernard
 Catherine Breillat

References

External links
 

2007 television films
2007 films
American documentary television films
American independent films
2000s American films
2007 independent films
2000s English-language films